Frederick 'Harold' Shapland (1900–1977), was an England international lawn bowler.

Bowls career
He competed for England in the pairs at the 1958 British Empire and Commonwealth Games in Cardiff with Fred Horn, where they finished in sixth place. He was an English international from 1950-1958.

Bowls official
He was President of the English Bowling Association in 1959.

Personal life
He was a farmer and company director by trade and Chairman of the British Wool Marketing Board. In 1952 he became Mayor of Tiverton and repeated the role in 1953 and 1971. His son Eric was a third successive generation to be mayor in 1973.

References

1900 births
1977 deaths
English male bowls players
Bowls players at the 1958 British Empire and Commonwealth Games
Commonwealth Games competitors for England